The Ruweng Administrative Area is an administrative area in South Sudan. The area was known as Ruweng State between 2 October 2015 and 22 February 2020 when it was a state of South Sudan.

History
On 1 October 2015, President Salva Kiir issued a decree establishing 32 states in place of the 10 constitutionally established states. The decree established the new states largely along ethnic lines. A number of opposition parties and civil society groups challenged the constitutionality of the decree. Kiir later resolved to take it to parliament for approval as a constitutional amendment. In November the South Sudanese parliament empowered President Kiir to create new states. Mayol Kur Akuei was appointed Governor in 2015.

Chief Administrators 

On 16 June 2022, President Salva Kiir appointed a new chief administrator.

On 8 June 2021, President Salva Kiir appointed a new chief administrator.

Geography
The Ruweng Administrative Area is located in the northern part of South Sudan and its headquarters is at Pariang. It borders the former Fashoda State in the east and Fangak State in the southeast, Northern Liech State in the south, Twic State in the southwest, Abyei to the west, and Sudan in the north.

Economy
It is the most oil producing area in South Sudan, about 80% of South Sudanese oil is produced here, mainly in Unity / Darbim oil field (in the southern part), Heglig / Panthou oil field (in the north-western part), Tomasouth/Kaloj oilfield (in the western part) and Toor / Athony oil field or and other oil fields like Labob / Miading and Munga / Wanhe Danluel oilfield and Maan Awal and others fields .

Ruweng  is rich in animal resources and fish resources, and it also is the home of two lakes: Lake Jau (in the northern part) and Lake No (in the southern part), where Bahr el Ghazal River ends and joins the White Nile.

Demographics
Ruweng is the home of Ruweng Dinkas which are Panaruu Dinka with 12 sub tribes and Aloor or Ruweng Biemnom Dinka with 6 sub-tribes.

Administrative divisions
The area consists of 2 counties: Panriang and Abiemnom.

See also
Biem, South Sudan

References

Ruweng Administrative Area
Greater Upper Nile
States of South Sudan